The Masons Arms is a pub on Fishergate, immediately south of the city centre of York, in England.

The Masons Arms was first recorded in 1835, when George Tilney successfully applied for a licence.  It had a bar, tap room and smoke room, and also offered one bedroom for visitors.

The pub was demolished and rebuilt in 1936, in a Tudor revival style.  The new building was designed by James Knight, who was working for Biscomb and Ferrey.  It is of two storeys, the ground floor of stone, and the first floor of brick, with timbers inlaid to resemble timber framing.  There are two front entrances, one either side of the central bay, with identical porches.  At each end of the front is a large corbel, one depicting the White Rose of York, and the other five lions, taken from the city's coat of arms.

The ground floor bar area has panelling and a fireplace dating from about 1830, which was taken from the gatehouse of York Castle, that having been demolished in 1935.  The lounge bar and sitting room were combined after World War II, but the public bar remains a separate space.

The building was grade II listed in 1996.  It was inundated during the 2015 York flood, and finally reopened in July 2016, following restoration.

References

External links

Buildings and structures completed in 1936
Grade II listed pubs in York